K.C. Kondaiah (born 10 July 1950), is an Indian politician and presently a member of the Karnataka Legislative Council from Bellary. He is a former member of the (Lok Sabha and Rajya Sabha) from Karnataka.

Kondaiah is an ardent partisan of the Nehru-Gandhi family. He was instrumental in Sonia Gandhi's  win from Bellary Lok Sabha Constituency in 1999.

Early life and background
Kondaiah started as a farmer after his schooling. In 1980, along with a group of friends, he started a company, namely Bellary Steels and Alloys Limited. The Steel Melt Shop was commissioned in the year 1987, with an initial capacity of 18,000 TPA. The capacity was enhanced to 50,000 TPA, in 1988. In the year 1995, the Electric Arc Furnace was replaced by an ultra high power Eccentric Bottom Tapping (EBT) furnace. The Direct Reduced Iron Plant was commissioned in 1992 – 1993. This was the first of its kind in South India. Most recently BSAL commissioned an Integrated Steel Plant with a capacity of 500,000 TPA having a layout provision to expand to 2 MTPA.

Political career
He was elected to the 11th Lok Sabha in 1996 from Bellary constituency in 1996. In the 11th Lok Sabha (1996–97) he was a member of the Committee on Science and Technology, Environment and Forests, a member (Special Invitee) of the Consultative Committee for the Ministry of Human Resource Development, a member of the Consultative Committee for the Ministry of Steel and Mines. He was also a member of the Coffee Board and the Z.R.U.C.C., Central and Southern Railway.

In 1998 he was re-elected to the 12th Lok Sabha from the same constituency. In the 12th Lok Sabha (1998–1999), he was a member of the Consultative Committee for the Ministry of Defence, the House Committee, Lok Sabha, the Z.R.U.C.C, Central and Southern Railway, the Committee on Energy. In 1999, he became the Convener, Congress Party in Parliament (Karnataka State).

He was a member of Rajya Sabha from Karnataka from January 2000 to April 2002. In June 2001, he was elected to the Karnataka Legislative Council and in June 2004, he was re-elected to the Karnataka Legislative Council.

References

External links
 Biodata

Living people
Rajya Sabha members from Karnataka
Indian National Congress politicians from Karnataka
India MPs 1998–1999
India MPs 1996–1997
1950 births
People from Bellary
Lok Sabha members from Karnataka
Members of the Karnataka Legislative Council